is a railway station in the town of Fusō, Aichi Prefecture,  Japan, operated by Meitetsu.

Lines

Station layout
The station has one island platform and one side platform connected by an elevated station building which is constructed over the tracks and platform. The station is staffed.

Platforms

Adjacent stations

|-
!colspan=5|Nagoya Railroad

Station history
Kashiwamori Station was opened on August 6, 1912.  A new station building was completed in February 2007.

Surrounding area
Kashiwamori Jinja

See also
 List of Railway Stations in Japan

References

External links

 Official web page 

Railway stations in Japan opened in 1912
Railway stations in Aichi Prefecture
Stations of Nagoya Railroad
Fusō, Aichi